Rosa Labordé is a Canadian playwright, screenwriter, director and actress. She is playwright-in-residence at Tarragon Theatre and Aluna Theatre. Her play Léo was shortlisted for the Dora Mavor Moore Award for Outstanding New Play and the Governor General's Award for English-language drama. In 2012 she received the KM Hunter Artist's Award for Theatre. In 2016 she wrote the first two episodes of the second season of HBO Canada's Sensitive Skin.

Early life 
Rosa was born to a Chilean mother and Eastern European father and was raised Jewish.

Plays 
 The Source  
 Sugar  
 Leo
 Hush  
 Like Wolves 
 True
 Marine Life

Acting

References

External links

Canadian television actresses
Canadian film actresses
Canadian stage actresses
Canadian voice actresses
Canadian women dramatists and playwrights
21st-century Canadian dramatists and playwrights
Canadian people of Chilean descent
Jewish Canadian actresses
Jewish Canadian writers
21st-century Canadian women writers
Living people
Year of birth missing (living people)